Allagelena bifida is a species of spider in the family Agelenidae. It was first described by Wang in 1997 as Agelena bifida. It is native to China. It was transferred to the genus Allagelena in 2017.

References

Agelenidae
Spiders described in 1997
Spiders of China